Choi Jae-bong (Korean: 최재봉, Hanja: 崔財鳳, born 19 June 1980) is a South Korean speed skater. He represented his country at the 1998 Winter Olympics in Nagano. At that time he was the holder of the junior World record at 1500 m, set in early December 1997 in Thialf, Heerenveen, where he clocked 1:52.25 to break the record. In Nagano where he finished in 12th position he broke his own world junior record to a new best time of 1:51.47, which was 0.78 of a second faster. He also finished in 29th position at the 5000 m. In November 1998 he broke the junior world record over 500 m into a new time of 36.30 in Calgary and a day later he broke his own 1500 m record again, this time 1:49.71 was his new best time. Due to these records and some other decent results in that same weekend he also broke the junior world record for the small allround classification to 153.689 points. That same season he won the bronze medal at the World Junior Allround Championships and broke another two world records. He set 1:10.87 at the 1000 m in February 1999 and a total of 143.965 points for the sprint classification again in Calgary.

As a senior, during his second Olympic Games, the 2002 Winter Olympics in Salt Lake City he finished 17th at the 500 m, 12th at the 1000 m and 21st at the 1500 m. He also represented South Korea four years later during the 2006 Winter Olympics in Turin. In Italy he finished in his all-time best Olympic result, by becoming 8th at the 500 m. He also became 17th at the 1000 m.

Personal records
 500 m – 35.12, 12 February 2002, Salt Lake City
 1000 m – 1:08.81, 16 February 2002, Salt Lake City
 1500 m – 1:47.26, 19 February 2002, Salt Lake City
 3000 m – 3:55.29, 15 November 1997, Calgary
 5000 m – 6:49.61, 7 December 1997, Heerenveen
 10000 m – 15:11.81, 23 February 1996, Seoul

External links
sskating.com
Choi Jae-bong at SpeedSkatingStats.com

Living people
1980 births
South Korean male speed skaters
Olympic speed skaters of South Korea
Speed skaters at the 1998 Winter Olympics
Speed skaters at the 2002 Winter Olympics
Speed skaters at the 2006 Winter Olympics
Dankook University alumni
Asian Games medalists in speed skating
Speed skaters at the 1996 Asian Winter Games
Speed skaters at the 1999 Asian Winter Games
Speed skaters at the 2003 Asian Winter Games
Speed skaters at the 2007 Asian Winter Games
Asian Games gold medalists for South Korea
Asian Games bronze medalists for South Korea
Medalists at the 1999 Asian Winter Games
Medalists at the 2007 Asian Winter Games